is a Japanese former volleyball player who competed in the 1972 Summer Olympics and in the 1976 Summer Olympics.

He was born in Hikone.

In 1972, he was part of the Japanese team which won the gold medal in the Olympic tournament. He played all seven matches.

Four years later, in 1976, he finished fourth with the Japanese team in the Olympic tournament. He played all five matches.

External links
 
 

1949 births
Living people
Japanese men's volleyball players
Olympic volleyball players of Japan
Volleyball players at the 1972 Summer Olympics
Volleyball players at the 1976 Summer Olympics
Olympic gold medalists for Japan
Olympic medalists in volleyball
Asian Games medalists in volleyball
Volleyball players at the 1970 Asian Games
Volleyball players at the 1974 Asian Games
Medalists at the 1970 Asian Games
Medalists at the 1974 Asian Games
Asian Games gold medalists for Japan
Medalists at the 1972 Summer Olympics